Vingtaine Haut de la Vallée is one of the five vingtaines of St Lawrence Parish on the Channel Island of Jersey.

References 

Vingtaines of Jersey
Saint Lawrence, Jersey